Patriarch Meletius may refer to:

 Meletius of Antioch, Patriarch in 361–381
 Meletius I Pegas, Greek Patriarch of Alexandria in 1590–1601
 Meletius of Jerusalem, Patriarch from 1731 to 1737
 Meletius II of Constantinople, Ecumenical Patriarch in 1769
 Meletius III of Constantinople, Ecumenical Patriarch in 1845
 Meletius II of Antioch, Patriarch from 1899 to 1906
 Meletius Metaxakis, Ecumenical Patriarch from 1921 to 1923 and Greek Patriarch of Alexandria from 1926 to 1935